Ronald Michael Delany (born 6 March 1935) is an Irish former athlete who specialised in middle-distance running. He won a gold medal in the 1500 metres event at the 1956 Summer Olympics in Melbourne. He later earned a bronze medal in the 1500 metres event at the 1958 European Athletics Championships in Stockholm.

Delany also competed at the 1954 European Athletics Championships in Bern and the 1960 Summer Olympics in Rome, though he was less successful on these occasions. He retired from competitive athletics in 1962. Delany is one of Ireland's most recognisable Olympians and international ambassadors.

Early life

Born in Arklow, County Wicklow, Delany moved with his family to Sandymount, Dublin 4 when he was six. Delany later went to the Christian Brothers' O'Connell School, North Richmond Street (where there are all-weather, floodlit sports facilities named in his honour), to Sandymount High School and to Catholic University School. At Catholic University School (CUS), Delany was first coached by Jack Sweeney (mathematics teacher), to whom he sent a telegram from Melbourne stating "We did it Jack".
Delany in 2008 said about Sweeney, "Other people would have seen my potential but he was the one who in effect helped me execute my potential".

Delany studied commerce and finance at Villanova University in the United States. While there he was coached by the well-known track coach Jumbo Elliott.

Career

Delany's first achievement of note was reaching the final of the 800 metres at the 1954 European Athletics Championships in Bern. In 1956, he became the seventh runner to join the club of four-minute milers, but nonetheless he struggled to make the Irish team for the 1956 Summer Olympics, held in Melbourne.

Delany qualified for the Olympic 1,500 metres final, in which local runner John Landy was the favourite. Delany kept close to Landy until the final lap, when Delany started a crushing final sprint, winning the race in a new Olympic record. Delany thereby became the first Irishman to win an Olympic gold medal in athletics since Bob Tisdall in 1932. The Irish people learned of its new champion at breakfast time. Delany was Ireland's last Olympic champion for 36 years, until Michael Carruth won the gold medal in boxing at the 1992 Summer Olympics in Barcelona.

Delany won the bronze medal in the 1,500 metres event at the 1958 European Athletics Championships. He went on to represent Ireland once again at the 1960 Summer Olympics held in Rome, this time in the 800 metres. He finished sixth in his quarter-final heat.

Delany continued his running career in North America, winning four successive AAU titles in the mile, adding to his total of four Irish national titles, and three NCAA titles. He was next to unbeatable on indoor tracks over that period, which included a 40-race winning streak. He broke the World Indoor Mile Record on three occasions. In 1961 Delany won the gold medal in the World University games in Sofia, Bulgaria. He retired from competitive running in 1962.

Retirement

After retiring from competition, Delany first worked in the United States for the Irish airline Aer Lingus. After that, for almost 20 years, he was Assistant Chief Executive of B&I Line, responsible for marketing and operations of the Irish ferry company based in Dublin. In 1998, he established his own company focused on marketing and sports consultancy.

Honours

In 2006, Delany was granted the Freedom of the City of Dublin. He was also conferred with an honorary Doctor of Laws Degree by University College Dublin in 2006. In 2019, a housing scheme in Arklow, where Delany was born, was named Delany Park in his honour. He attended the opening in person.  Similarly, two streets in Strabane in Northern Ireland were named Delaney Crescent and Olympic Drive in the 1950s in his honour – however, Delany was not aware of these until it was pointed out that his surname had been spelt wrongly.

References

1935 births
Athletes (track and field) at the 1956 Summer Olympics
Athletes (track and field) at the 1960 Summer Olympics
European Athletics Championships medalists
Irish male middle-distance runners
Living people
Medalists at the 1956 Summer Olympics
Medalists at the 1961 Summer Universiade
Olympic athletes of Ireland
Olympic gold medalists for Ireland
Olympic gold medalists in athletics (track and field)
People from Arklow
Sportspeople from County Wicklow
Universiade gold medalists for Ireland
Universiade medalists in athletics (track and field)
Villanova University alumni